Jakten på julen (The Hunt for Christmas) was the 1981 edition of Sveriges Radio's Christmas Calendar.

Plot
Jacob and Nina's adventures as they travel to various places in Norway and Sweden on a magical, flying tandem bicycle that they've found in the attic of their grandfather's house.

References

1981 radio programme debuts
1981 radio programme endings
Sveriges Radio's Christmas Calendar